Lost In Society is an alternative band based out of Asbury Park, New Jersey. The band currently consists of Zach Moyle (lead vocals, guitar), Nick Ruroede (bass, backup vocals), Sam Maynard (guitar, backup vocals) and Hector Bonora (drums).

History
Playing in various bands throughout highschool Lost In Society formed in 2004, quickly gaining attention in the Asbury Park area.  Wasting no time the band went into Little Eden to record five songs with Pete Steinkopf of The Bouncing Souls.  That EP would eventually be released on Altercation Records in the form of a split with White Plains, NY's American Pinup.  

With the success of the split Lost In Society would go on to be added to the 2012 Van's Warped Tour in support of their  full length, 2012's Let It Sail also on Altercation Records.  Heavy touring followed and the band saw themselves opening for high-profile acts such as The Bouncing Souls, The Misfits, The Flatliners, Catch 22 and countless others.  The band also found themselves playing Gainesville's The FEST, Fun Fun Fun Fest, and Montreal's Pouzza Fest.  

2014 was a good year for the band and marked their first appearance at Las Vegas's Punk Rock Bowling with the band playing the main stage their first time at the festival.  Following their appearance at PRB the band started another run on The Van's Warped Tour with their song Plastic appearing on Sideonedummy's Warped Tour Compilation.  Taking a brief hiatus from touring in the winter of 2014 LIS embarked on their first European run in early 2015 in support of a split released on Panic State Records with the UK's River Jumpers.

In the summer of 2015 Lost In Society were added as support to Dead Sara's west coast tour.

Members

Current
 Zach Moyle - vocals/guitar 
 Nick Ruroede - bass/vocals
 Sam Maynard - guitar/ backup vocals
 Hector Bonora - drums

Discography

Albums
Eastern Empire (2009, Aeria Records)
Let It Sail (2012, Altercation Records)
Modern Illusions (2016, Handsome Stranger Records)

EPs
Gone (2006, Lakehouse Music)
Eager Heart (2018, Wiretap Records)

Split
Lost In Society/American Pinup (2012, Altercation Records)
Panic State Records Split Series Vol 1: River Jumpers/ Lost In Society (2015, Panic State Records)

Compilations
Blood Sweat & Punk Volume 1, (2012, Altercation Records)
Warped Tour Compilation 2012, (2012, Side One Dummy Records)
Blood Sweat & Punk Volume 2, (2013, Altercation Records)
Warped Tour Compilation 2014, (2014, Side One Dummy Records)

References

External links

 Goldenmix Interview
  Pop-Break Interview
  The Vinyl District Interview

Punk rock groups from New Jersey
Musical groups established in 2012
Asbury Park, New Jersey
2012 establishments in New Jersey